Nicolas Vouilloz (born 11 May 2001) is a Swiss professional footballer who plays as a defender for Swiss club Servette.

Career statistics

Club

Notes

References

2001 births
Living people
Sportspeople from the canton of Geneva
Swiss men's footballers
Switzerland youth international footballers
Association football defenders
Swiss Super League players
Servette FC players